Andrew McLean Galloway IV (Scottish Gaelic: Anndra MacGill-Eain Gall-Ghàidhealaibh IV) (born 6 June 1985) is a Scottish professional wrestler. He is currently signed to WWE, where he performs on the SmackDown brand under the ring name Drew McIntyre.

McIntyre is a two-time WWE Champion, one-time WWE Intercontinental Champion, one-time NXT Champion, and a two-time WWE (Raw) Tag Team Champion, and also won the 2020 Slammy Award for Superstar of the Year. He performed as Drew Galloway outside of WWE from 20012007 and again from 20142017, most notably with Total Nonstop Action Wrestling (TNA), where he was a one-time TNA World Heavyweight Champion and one-time Impact Grand Champion. He has also wrestled extensively on the independent circuit, where he is the inaugural and two-time ICW World Heavyweight Champion, one-time Evolve Champion, one-time Open the Freedom Gate Champion, two-time Evolve Tag Team Champion, and one-time WCPW Champion.

Galloway returned to WWE in April 2017 under the Drew McIntyre ring name and joined its then-developmental brand NXT, where he won the NXT Championship at NXT TakeOver: Brooklyn III, becoming the first man to win the championship in his TakeOver in-ring debut and the first WWE wrestler to hold it after having previously won a championship on the main roster. Upon returning to WWE's main roster in 2018, he won the Raw Tag Team Championship, the 2020 Men's Royal Rumble match, and the WWE Championship in the main event of the second night of WrestleMania 36. He is the first British world champion in WWE and the 31st Triple Crown champion. In total, Galloway is a five-time world champion in professional wrestling.

Early life
Andrew McLean Galloway IV was born in Ayr on 6 June 1985. He grew up in nearby Prestwick, where he studied at Prestwick Academy. He considered being a professional football player when he was younger. He played for the youth club Prestwick Boys, normally in defensive positions, before concentrating on wrestling; he has named Bret Hart as his favourite wrestler. When he was 10 years old, Galloway read a magazine named X Factor, which focused on conspiracy theories and ghost stories; this prompted him to write a letter to the FBI under the Freedom of Information Act, to which the FBI responded by sending him a file with several documents. He began training for a professional wrestling career at the age of 15, and his parents agreed to support him as long as he gave the same amount of focus to his studies. He agreed and went on to earn a master's degree in criminology from Glasgow Caledonian University.

Professional wrestling career

Training and debut (2001–2006) 
Galloway began training as a wrestler at the Frontier Wrestling Alliance's Academy at the age of 15 after his family moved to England and settled in Portsmouth. Although he was trained by the promotion's operator Mark Sloan along with Justin Richards and James Tighe, he also cites the promotion's established wrestlers helping out with training, including Doug Williams, Paul Burchill and Alex Shane.

In 2003, Galloway made his debut for the inaugural show of British Championship Wrestling (BCW), operating in the Greater Glasgow area. While there, he honed his skills further, training under Colin McKay and later Spinner McKenzie, then developing the character of "Thee" Drew Galloway, a cocky narcissist. His first match, which took place at February's No Blood, No Sympathy: Night 1, saw him lose against Stu Natt. He picked up his first win on the second night in a tag team match alongside Wolfgang, defeating Blade and Stu Pendous. By December, Galloway was managed by Charles Boddington, who aided him in his first significant success and managed him for the next four years.

Later that year, Galloway had a series of matches against American veterans. In June, he lost to The Honky Tonk Man and later that month lost to Marty Jannetty and Highlander, with Sabotage on his side. In November, at the aptly titled Lo Down, Galloway main evented in a double countout match against D'Lo Brown. He then had a brief series of feuds, as in March 2005, he defeated Jay Phoenix but their rematch in November, officiated by Mick Foley, ended in a no contest. In May 2006, after their lengthy feud in Irish Whip Wrestling, Galloway lost then won in successive matches against long-term rival Sheamus O'Shaunessy.

Independent circuit (2006–2007) 
In November 2006, Galloway and Lionheart, in the main event of Live in East Kilbride, pinned BCW Heavyweight Champion Highlander, who was tagging with Wolfgang. This put Galloway in contention for the title at December's No Blood, No Sympathy IV event, which was booked as an "I Quit" match with Conscience as the special guest referee. At the event, he won his second BCW Heavyweight Championship. He held the title through 2007, with successful defenses against the likes of Martin Stone, Allan Grogan and Lionheart, before vacating the title when he relocated to the United States in September.

After gaining momentum in Scotland, Galloway began wrestling dates across the Republic of Ireland with Irish Whip Wrestling (IWW), continuing to use "Thee" Drew Galloway as his gimmick. With Charles Boddington still in his corner, he competed in three contests during his first appearance on 23 July 2005 for Whiplash TV. After losing to "SOS" Sheamus O'Shaunessy, he found a similar fate against Mad Man Manson, sparking a feud between the two. Despite these two losses, his status abroad meant he was already booked in a Ten-Man Gauntlet match to determine the top contender for the main title. Galloway was whitewashed the entire evening, losing to Vic Viper. At Gym Wars the following day, Manson was absent, so Galloway tried to avenge his loss with O'Shaunessy but it ended in a double count-out. Over the next few months, he recruited various wrestlers, even his manager Boddington, in a series of tag team and even handicap tag team matches against Manson and his teams. He picked up his first victory in October against Sean South in a warm-up for that event's main event six-man tag team match. The rivalry between Galloway and Manson was settled in November at IWW's final show from the SFX Theatre. Their brutal and bloody Street Fight saw Galloway gain respect from for his tenacity and endurance, but his losing streak continued.

Galloway was soon given a shot at the IWW International Heavyweight Championship owing to his show stealing performances with Manson. On 28 January 2006, he received his first title match against O'Shaunessy, evolving their rivalry from previous battles. The rivalry quickly took on a patriotic flavour, with Galloway's blue colours of Scotland clashing with O'Shaunessy's green colours of Ireland, mirroring the Old Firm football derby between Glasgow Rangers and Glasgow Celtic, respectively. This football allusion became particularly prominent when the two met again at Verona Football Club once again for the title; although the match changed into a Lumberjack match, the result and champion remained the same. A two out of three falls match against the champion took place on 18 March, in which O'Shaunessy won two falls to one; the next day produced the same result. With their rivalry intensifying, his next challenge to O'Shaunessy was given the stipulation of a Last Man Standing match, but he retained the title, as he also did in June with the same stipulation.

On 27 August 2006, Galloway finally managed to beat O'Shaunessy, winning the IWW International Heavyweight Championship. He successfully defended the belt that evening against Go Shiozaki. In November, Galloway took the championship to London, England against Jody Fleisch. However, unable to commit to fully defending the title due to other bookings in his homeland and his academic studies, he was forced to relinquish the championship in January 2007.

While BCW became his home promotion and he made regular appearances for IWW, Galloway made several appearances around the independent circuit. In 2004, he appeared for the fledgling International Pro Wrestling: United Kingdom (IPW:UK) at their aptly titled Show 2. Despite losing to Aviv Maayan in his first showing, by the time he returned in May 2005 his reputation made him notorious enough to compete in their main event Five Way Elimination match to determine the best of British heavyweights. Galloway was eliminated first by Andy Boy Simmonz with a small package pin. In between studying, Galloway competed in several tours of All Star Wrestling against competitors including TJ Wilson, PN Neuz, Chad Collyer and Brody Steele during 2006. On 15 October 2006, Galloway competed in the Insane Championship Wrestling (ICW) debut show Fear & Loathing, defeating Darkside and Allan Grogan in a three-way 30-minute Iron Man match to become the first ICW Heavyweight Champion. He held the title for 280 days, ultimately losing it to Darkside on 22 July 2007 in a five-man elimination match that also involved Jack Jester, Wolfgang and Liam Thomson.

Despite it being his only match (he was used twice) for NWA: Scottish Wrestling Alliance (NWA:SWA), Galloway represented Team SWA against Team Sinner in the titular match for the March 2006 Clan Wars event, being eliminated first by Highlander who was using the ropes. At the end of the month, he appeared at the inaugural event for Premier British Wrestling (PBW) earning a shot to become the first PBW Heavyweight Champion by defeating Allan Grogan but lost to Wolfgang in the main event. In October he was entered into a contendership match to win another chance at the title, but lost to Dave Moralez. Galloway's reputation continued to precede him as he was placed in the Real Quality Wrestling (RQW) Not Just For Christmas 2006 tournament to crown the inaugural RQW Heavyweight Champion. Representing IWW and having made his IWW Title defence against Fleisch earlier in the year, Galloway faced SAS Wrestling's El Ligero, going through to the semi-final only to lose to One Pro Wrestling's Pac by count-out. He continued to appear in April 2007, taking his rivalry with O'Shaunessy to London with a double count-out which led to a rematch in June where Galloway picked up the victory in a Street Fight. Later on that evening, having made a statement with his win over O'Shaunessy, Galloway attacked the RQW Heavyweight Champion Martin Stone during his title defence against Takeshi Rikio. This attack led to his final match in the UK at August's Summer Brawl, which he lost. His last appearance was serving as a referee for PBW on 15 September in a match that saw Darkside defeat Lionheart to become a contender for the championship.

Galloway appeared on the inaugural Insane Championship Wrestling show promoted by a young Mark Dallas. Galloway won a triple threat match over Darkside and Allan Grogan to become the first-ever ICW Heavyweight Champion. He held the title for 280 days, retaining over Wolfgang and Allan Grogan, before losing the title to Darkside in a five-man match which also included Jack Jester, Wolfgang and Liam Thomson. This was his final appearance for the company until 2014.

World Wrestling Entertainment/WWE

Early appearances (2007–2008) 
Galloway signed with WWE in late 2007 and made his official WWE debut on the 12 October 2007 episode of SmackDown! under the modified ring name of Drew McIntyre. In his debut match, McIntyre, accompanied by his on-screen mentor Dave Taylor, defeated Brett Major with a roll-up, establishing himself as a villainous character. The next week, he defeated Brian Major with the help of Taylor. At the beginning of 2008, McIntyre was separated from Taylor and moved to the Raw brand, making his official debut on the 6 January episode of Heat as a face, defeating Charlie Haas.

Ohio Valley Wrestling/OVW (2007–2008) 
In September 2007, McIntyre went to Louisville for Ohio Valley Wrestling, with his first match being a dark match after OVW TV, where he took on another developmental talent from the UK, "The Ripper" Paul Burchill. Despite Drew not being involved in a great deal of noteworthy feuds during his time in OVW—mainly due to the fact that he was splitting time between being on the road with WWE, while still having to report to developmental in OVW—he still wrestled regularly on OVW TV & non-televised live events in the Kentuckiana area. Drew formed a tag team with the future Wade Barrett—known as Stu Sanders at the time—forming the very physically impressive "Brit Pack". In February 2008, WWE announced they would be pulling their contract with OVW and owner Nightmare Danny Davis; as a result, it would no longer be a part of WWE's developmental system.

Florida Championship Wrestling (2008–2009) 
After his short stint on WWE's main roster, McIntyre was moved to WWE's developmental territory Florida Championship Wrestling (FCW). He reformed his team with Stu Sanders, now going under the name of The Empire. In April, they took on The Puerto Rican Nightmares (Eric Pérez and Eddie Colón) who won the match and a title shot at the FCW Florida Tag Team Championship. Once The Nightmares won the championship, The Empire received two consecutive chances to win the FCW Florida Tag Team Championship on 6 May. Their first title defence was against McIntyre's old rival Sheamus O'Shaunessy, but his partner "Sterling Jack" Gabriel accidentally hit them and The Empire capitalised to retain their championship. The Empire lost the championship on 17 July to Joe Hennig and Gabe Tuft. On 16 August, The Empire imploded when McIntyre faced Sanders in a singles match which ended in a double countout and their rematch at the end of September ended in a time limit draw.

On 7 October, McIntyre was entered into a contest for the FCW Florida Heavyweight Championship and defeated Tuft to make it into the finals but lost to Eric Escobar (the former Eric Peréz). McIntyre closed out the year with an unsuccessful attempt to gain the FCW Florida Heavyweight Championship in a four-way match, but Escobar won the title from O'Shaunessy.

Going into 2009, McIntyre entered into a rivalry with Joe Hennig, but their first match in February ended in a double countout. McIntyre interfered in Hennig's match the following week, costing him the match. On 26 February, Hennig defeated McIntyre and went on that night to win the FCW Florida Heavyweight Championship from Escobar. Their feud ended abruptly when Hennig vacated the title after an injury, causing McIntyre to be elevated into title contendership, beating Escobar for the vacant championship on 19 March. McIntyre regularly defended the title until 11 June, when Tyler Reks (the former Gabe Tuft) won the title in his second attempt. On 25 June, McIntyre was set to team with O'Shaunessy against the returning Hennig and DJ Gabriel (the aforementioned "Sterling Jack" Gabriel), but when neither team would work together a four-way was booked, which O'Shaunessy won. McIntyre and O'Shaunessy both failed to win back the FCW Florida Heavyweight Championship in mid-July from Reks. McIntyre received a singles opportunity the next day with the same result.

Intercontinental Champion (2009–2010) 

On 28 August 2009, McIntyre re-debuted on the SmackDown brand, disregarding his previous time on WWE television, and established himself as a villain by attacking R-Truth as he entered the ring, using his new double underhook DDT finishing move, the Scot Drop (soon renamed the Future Shock). McIntyre continued to attack Truth over the following weeks, claiming to be on the show to wrestle, not to party like R-Truth. On 18 September, while Charlie Haas was waiting to face R-Truth, McIntyre came to the ring to explain that R-Truth had been injured backstage, and then attacked Haas. On 25 September, WWE chairman Mr. McMahon introduced McIntyre as a "future world champion" that he had personally signed, after which Truth made a return attack against McIntyre. At the Hell in a Cell pay-per-view (PPV) on 4 October, McIntyre defeated R-Truth in under five minutes again using his DDT finisher. He faced R-Truth once more in a singles match and won by countout to represent SmackDown at Bragging Rights on 25 October, but on the episode before the event, the entire team, captains aside, was replaced, leaving McIntyre omitted from the event. McIntyre briefly feuded with Finlay in the same manner as Truth with matches not starting properly until McIntyre won their final meeting in under two minutes. At Survivor Series on 22 November, McIntyre had a place on The Miz's team for the traditional Survivor Series elimination match. McIntyre, The Miz and his former rival Sheamus were the surviving members on their winning team; McIntyre eliminated Evan Bourne and Matt Hardy.

Being the only SmackDown superstar to survive against Team Morrison, McIntyre faced and defeated John Morrison a few weeks later, putting him in line for Morrison's Intercontinental Championship at TLC: Tables, Ladders & Chairs (TLC). Days before the event, Morrison mocked McIntyre's Scottish heritage by dressing as a Braveheart-inspired William Wallace, but at TLC on 13 December, McIntyre pinned Morrison after a thumb to the eye to win the Intercontinental Championship, his first championship in WWE. He retained the title against Morrison and later against Kane using underhanded tactics. His televised undefeated record ended in a Money in the Bank qualifying match against Kane on 26 February episode of SmackDown, but Mr McMahon forced SmackDown's general manager Teddy Long to expunge the loss. The same thing happened again with Matt Hardy before McIntyre qualified for the ladder match by pinning an unsigned wrestler. McIntyre failed to win the Money in the Bank match on 28 March at WrestleMania XXVI, his first WrestleMania appearance. McIntyre continuously attacked Matt Hardy until he was stripped of his title on 7 May by Long and suspended for the purposes of the storyline; McMahon decreed he be reinstated as champion the following week, undermining Long's authority which developed tension between McIntyre and Long.

McIntyre faced Kofi Kingston—who had won a tournament to determine the new champion—at Over the Limit on 23 May, losing the Intercontinental Championship after 161 days. However, he still used his relationship with McMahon to bully Long, publicly humiliating and forcing Long to lie down for him for their match. At Fatal 4-Way on 20 June, McIntyre faced Kingston in a rematch for the title. During the match, Long took over as the referee, but he refused to make the three count when McIntyre had the match won. A vengeful Matt Hardy then attacked McIntyre, leading to Kingston winning the match and retaining the championship. On 21 June episode of Raw, The Nexus faction attacked McMahon which removed him from television for a prolonged period and ended McIntyre's preferential treatment. After losing to Matt Hardy on 25 June episode of SmackDown, Long informed McIntyre that his work visa had expired and that he would be deported back to Scotland immediately. This storyline had a basis in reality, since Galloway's visa had indeed expired and as a result he was taken off television.

Various storylines (2010–2012) 
McIntyre returned two weeks later and was re-instated after being made to beg Long. On 19 September at Night of Champions, McIntyre and Cody Rhodes won the WWE Tag Team Championship in a five-team tag team turmoil match, allowing them to appear on both brands. McIntyre and Rhodes then retained the titles twice against The Hart Dynasty. At Bragging Rights on 24 October, McIntyre and Rhodes lost the titles to The Nexus (John Cena and David Otunga) and dissolved their team. On 21 November at Survivor Series, McIntyre participated in a 5-on-5 traditional Survivor Series tag team match as a member of Team Del Rio against Team Mysterio. McIntyre was the final man remaining on his team before he was eliminated by Big Show. McIntyre participated in the 40-man Royal Rumble match on 30 January, where he was eliminated by Big Show. On 20 February at Elimination Chamber, he participated in the SmackDown Elimination Chamber match for the World Heavyweight Championship but was eliminated by Kane. 

On 26 April, McIntyre was drafted to the Raw brand as part of the 2011 supplemental draft. McIntyre featured very rarely on Raw and was confined to dark matches and Superstars; he last appeared on SmackDown in a Blindfold Match against Santino Marella, which he lost. On 15 December episode of Superstars, McIntyre defeated Justin Gabriel, which earned him a contract with SmackDown. He switched to the SmackDown brand on 30 December and resumed his tense relationship with general manager Theodore Long who put pressure on McIntyre to win matches to justify his contract and McIntyre subsequently began an eight match losing streak going into the new year, after the last of which, Long fired McIntyre within the storyline. A week later, McIntyre was reinstated by guest general manager John Laurinaitis and he finally ended his losing streak by defeating Hornswoggle. He was subsequently included on Laurinaitis' team in the 12-man tag team match at WrestleMania XXVIII on 1 April, helping to earn Laurinaitis control of both the Raw and SmackDown brands. He continued to lose matches and was confined to Superstars and house shows, but was still able to make several appearances on Raw and SmackDown, albeit in squash matches.

When WWE rebranded its developmental territory, FCW, into NXT, McIntyre was inserted into the Gold Rush Tournament to crown the inaugural NXT Champion, where he lost to the eventual winner Seth Rollins in the quarter-finals on 1 August episode of NXT. McIntyre also participated in a number one contender fatal four-way elimination match on 7 November episode of NXT, but was eliminated by Bo Dallas.

3MB (2012–2014) 

On 21 September episode of SmackDown, McIntyre and Jinder Mahal interfered in a match between Heath Slater and Brodus Clay by attacking Clay, aligning themselves with Slater. The trio became known as the Three Man Band, or 3MB for short. Due to a wrist injury, McIntyre managed Slater and Mahal in tag matches. McIntyre returned to the ring from injury on 7 December episode of SmackDown when 3MB defeated The Usos and Brodus Clay. At TLC: Tables, Ladders & Chairs on 16 December, after being guests on Miz TV and harassing the Spanish announce team, 3MB challenged The Miz and Alberto Del Rio to find a partner for a six-man tag team match for later that night. Miz announced their partner to be the Brooklyn Brawler, and went on to defeat 3MB. The next night on Raw, 3MB lost to The Miz and Del Rio again, this time with Tommy Dreamer as their partner. On 31 December episode of Raw, McIntyre and Slater challenged Team Hell No (Daniel Bryan and Kane) for the WWE Tag Team Championship in a losing effort. McIntyre and Slater also competed in the first round of the NXT Tag Team Championship tournament to crown the inaugural champions, but were defeated by Adrian Neville and Oliver Grey on 23 January episode of NXT.

At Royal Rumble on 27 January 2013, McIntyre competed in the 30-man Royal Rumble match where he was eliminated by Chris Jericho. On 12 April episode of SmackDown, in an attempt to make a name for themselves, 3MB tried to attack Triple H, but were attacked themselves by The Shield (Dean Ambrose, Seth Rollins and Roman Reigns). On 15 April episode of Raw, 3MB called out The Shield, only for Brock Lesnar to come out instead and attack the group. On 29 April episode of Raw, 3MB attacked The Shield, but The Shield quickly turned the tables on them. This resulted in Team Hell No chasing away The Shield, before attacking 3MB themselves. Beginning in late 2013, 3MB began adopting new ring names against their opponents, although their misfortunes and amounting losses remained the same. At WrestleMania XXX on 6 April, McIntyre competed in the André the Giant Memorial Battle Royal but was eliminated by Mark Henry. On 12 June 2014, WWE announced that McIntyre was released from his WWE contract.

Return to ICW (2014–2017) 
Galloway, under his real name, made his first post-WWE appearance on 27 July 2014, returning to work for Mark Dallas at Insane Championship Wrestling (ICW) for the first time in seven years and beginning a feud with Jack Jester. On 2 November at ICW's "Fear & Loathing VII" event at The Barrowlands, Galloway defeated Jester in the main event to become a two-time ICW Heavyweight Champion. Galloway made his first international ICW title defense in Denmark on 20 December in a double championship triple threat match against Danish Pro Wrestling Champion Michael Fynne and Chaos, where he both retained the ICW title and gained the DPW Heavyweight Championship. Galloway competed in his final match of 2014 in a surprise appearance at ICW's "Space Baws 5: Bill Murray Strikes Back" by answering the challenge of Lewis Girvan, who had been goading Galloway for a match– Galloway defeated Girvan to retain the ICW Heavyweight Championship. Following the match, he announced his intention to make the title a world championship by continuing to defend it internationally.

On 25 January 2015 at "Square Go", Galloway retained the title against Chris Renfrew. On 9 February, after retaining against Matt Hardy in a match for the Family Wrestling Entertainment promotion in New York, he subsequently renamed it the ICW World Heavyweight Championship. Galloway defended the championship in Australia for the first time on 20 March, defeating Andy Phoenix at an Outback Championship Wrestling TV taping. Galloway made his first defence in Scotland as "World Champion" by defeating Joe Coffey in the main-event of BarraMania on 28 March. On 5 April, Galloway made his first defense of the ICW title in England defeating Doug Williams at a Revolution Pro Wrestling (RPW) show and on 6 April, Galloway made his first ICW title defence in Ireland at a Pro Wrestling Ulster show, defeating Joe Hendry, TRON and Luther Valentine in a Four Way. On 11 April, Galloway defeated Grado to retain the World Championship, after the match both men were attacked by returning former champion Jack Jester. The following night, Galloway suffered his first loss in ICW since his return, where he and Grado lost to Jack Jester and Sabu after Grado was pinned. On 18 April, Galloway defeated both Jack Jester and Grado in a triple threat match to retain his championship again, before having the championship stolen post-match by Sabu. The following night at "Alex Kidd in London" at KOKO, Galloway regained possession of the belt and retained his championship in an Elimination Three Way Dance against Sabu and Jack Jester. Galloway finished the "Insane Entertainment Tour" by defeating Mikey Whiplash in the Main-Event of "Flawless Victory" on 2 May, to once again retain the ICW World Heavyweight Championship. On 16 October at a Max Wrestling show in Germany, Galloway successfully defended the ICW World Championship in a triple threat against Apu Singh and Chaos, in which Chaos' UEWA European Heavyweight Championship was also on the line.

At Shug's Hoose Party 2, Galloway turned heel along with Jack Jester and ICW GM Red Lightning as they aligned to form 'The Black Label'. With Jester's help, he successfully defended the championship against Big Damo in the main event. Galloway successfully retained his World Championship against Rhino, Joey D and Kris Travis throughout the rest of the summer. As part of the "Road to Fear & Loathing" tour, Galloway made successful title defenses of the ICW title against Rampage Brown, Doug Williams, Matt Daly and Coach Trip. During the tour, Galloway also teamed with Black Label stablemate Jack Jester to challenge Polo Promotions for the ICW Tag Team Championships but were defeated following interference from Grado. On 15 November, Galloway lost the title against Grado at Fear & Loathing VIII. Galloway returned to ICW in February 2016 for the UK & Ireland tour, scoring wins over Mark Coffey, Noam Dar and BT Gunn, but suffering a loss in a match against Chris Renfrew for the ICW World Heavyweight Championship. On 29 May 2016, in the main event of the Fight Network premiere episode of "ICW Friday Night Fight Club", Galloway and Jester defeated The Local Fire (Joe Hendry & Davey Boy).

Galloway was then out of action from August until November due to a back injury but appeared on ICW shows in non-wrestling roles to further his feud with Mark Dallas. On 19 November, Galloway announced his departure from ICW due to the severity of his injuries, reconciling with Mark Dallas before attacking Dallas and revealing it to have been a rouse. It was announced on 1 February 2018 that Galloway would be inducted into the ICW Hall of Fame.

Evolve (2014–2017) 
On 8 August 2014 Galloway debuted for Evolve, defeating Chris Hero for the Evolve Championship. His first loss in Evolve came at Evolve 33, in a Champion vs Champion match against the DGUSA Open The Freedom Gate champion Ricochet. Galloway continued to defend the Evolve championship stateside against the likes of Caleb Konley, Stevie Richards, Devin Thomas, Jimmy Rave and Victor Sterling at independent events across the US and Rich Swann on Evolve iPPV at Evolve 34, while also defending the championship internationally in Scotland against Kid Fite, Johnny Moss, Big Damo and Andy Wild, as well as in England, where he retained over reigning NWA World Tag Team Champion Davey Boy Smith Jr. Following multiple international title defenses, Galloway renamed his title the "Evolve World Championship" on 9 January 2015. Galloway made his first successful defense as World Champion the following night at Evolve 37, defeating Ricochet. The international title defenses continued on 20 March 2015, where Galloway defeated Andy Phoenix in a Triple Championship match for Australian promotion Outback Championship Wrestling, retaining both the Evolve and ICW World Championships and winning Phoenix's OCW Heavyweight Championship.

At Evolve 39, he retained the Evolve Championship over PJ Black. At Mercury Rising 2015, Galloway defeated Johnny Gargano for the Dragon Gate USA Open the Freedom Gate Championship in a Title vs Title match, where he retained the Evolve Championship to become a double champion. Galloway made a series of defenses of the Evolve and DGUSA titles between 4 and 6 April 2015 in Scotland, England and Northern Ireland, defeating Marty Scurll, Doug Williams and Joe Hendry, Tron and Luther Valentine in a Four Way. At Evolve 43, Galloway made his first standalone defense of the DGUSA Open the Freedom Gate championship, defeating Biff Busick. At Evolve 44, Galloway defeated Roderick Strong to retain the Evolve Championship, ending their feud. On 10 July, Galloway lost both the Evolve World Championship and the Open the Freedom Gate Championship to Timothy Thatcher; at this point Galloway was the longest reigning Evolve champion in history and set the record for most successful title defenses. At Evolve 46, after defeating Trent Barreta, he was attacked by The Premiere Athlete Brand, but afterwards, uncharacteristically attacked Andrea, threatened SoCal Val and assaulted a referee. Galloway was subsequently suspended from EVOLVE. He returned at Evolve 51, where he defeated FIP World Heavyweight Champion Caleb Konley. At Evolve 52, he received a rematch against Thatcher for the Evolve Championship but lost.

Between 22 and 24 January 2016, Galloway and Johnny Gargano entered a three-day tournament to crown the inaugural Evolve Tag Team Champions. At Evolve 53, they defeated Catch Point (Drew Gulak and T. J. Perkins), The Bravado Brothers at Evolve 54, and in the finals at Evolve 55, they defeated Chris Hero and Tommy End to win the tournament and championship. They lost the title to Drew Gulak and Tracy Williams on 2 April. Following the match, Galloway claimed that he spent his entire title reign as Evolve champion bringing legitimacy to Evolve, only for WWE and more specifically NXT to come and squash everything he did, while also claiming the company's working relationship with WWE was compromising independent wrestling. Galloway then turned on Gargano, attacking him and Ethan Page, whom he defeated at Evolve 60. Over the following months, Galloway aligned himself with other WWE stars. Galloway and Ethan Carter III defeated Gargano and TJP in the street fight main event at Evolve 62 with help from Hero, who joined their group and claimed Cody Rhodes would be joining the group. At Evolve 63, Galloway defeated Page in an "Anything Goes" match. At Evolve 64, a match between Galloway and Gulak was rescheduled as an Evolve Tag Team Championship main-event match between Catch Point and Galloway and the returning Chuck Taylor (now under the name "Dustin"), in which they won the titles, making Galloway the first ever two-time Evolve Tag Team Champion. At Evolve 65, Galloway defeated Gargano.

Dustin and Galloway made their first Evolve Tag Team Championship defense at Evolve 67 on 20 August 2016, teaming with EC3 against Fred Yehi, TJP and Ethan Page (replacement for Tracy Williams) in a no disqualification six man tag-team match, which they lost after EC3 was pinned, also resulting in a title change. Galloway also built a feud with former partner Cody Rhodes and veteran announcer Joey Styles, after they both refused his invitation to join his "crusade". On 13 November, while Galloway was out with an injury, their replacement, Chris Hero, lost the Evolve Tag Team Championship. However, it was announced that, despite supposed champions Catch Point holding the physical belts, Evolve continued to recognize Galloway and Dustin as the Evolve Tag Team Champions.

Return to the independent circuit (2014–2017) 
Following his WWE release, Galloway returned to the Independent circuit, wrestling in different countries and winning titles in Australia, Denmark, Scotland, and other regions. On 30 August 2014, WrestleZone Scotland held their annual "Battle of the Nations" match, which saw Galloway represent Scotland in a winning effort over England representative Andy Wilde; he retained the EVOLVE Championship during the match. In November, Galloway debuted for Tommy Dreamer's House of Hardcore promotion at "HOH VII", losing to Austin Aries. On 23 January 2015, Galloway competed in a one-night tournament for the International Wrestling Federation (IWF) World Championship, defeating Tommaso Ciampa to advance to the finals, where he faced Brian Cage, Chris Hero and Uhaa Nation in an elimination four way for the vacant title in a losing effort. On 24 April, Galloway defeated Doug Williams to win the Scottish Wrestling Alliance's Scottish Heavyweight Championship. He made his first successful defense the following night, defeating SWA Tag Team Champion Mark Coffey in the main event. In a rematch in November, Galloway lost the title to Coffey. In May 2015, Galloway debuted for Lucha Libre AAA Worldwide (AAA), teaming with Angelico and El Mesias against Matt Hardy, Mr. Anderson and Johnny Mundo. He returned to Mexico in November to main-event a series of AAA affiliated shows, working three six-man tag matches against Rey Mysterio, Blue Demon and Dr. Wagner Jr.; his partners included Matt Cross, Carlito and Brodus Clay.

In August 2015, Galloway debuted for Preston City Wrestling (PCW) and feuded with Noam Dar, where they traded wins and losses. Galloway returned to PCW in February 2016, entering the "Road to Glory" tournament, defeating Martin Kirby, Mr. Anderson and Noam Dar, before losing to Rampage Brown in the finals. In February 2016, it was announced that Galloway would enter the Westside Xtreme Wrestling (wXw) "16 Carat Gold Tournament". Galloway defeated Silas Young in the first round and Angelico in the quarter-finals, but lost immediately to Axel Dieter Jr. in the semi-finals. On 4 June, Galloway became the #1 contender for the PCW Heavyweight Championship by winning the "There Can Be Only One" Gauntlet. On 25 June, Galloway main-evented the first HD iPPV in European Wrestling history when he returned to PCW at their "Tribute to the Troops 3" show, receiving his championship opportunity; he lost a PCW Heavyweight Championship triple threat match with Sha Samuels and Noam Dar after Samuels submitted Dar. On 19 August, Galloway debuted for the House of Glory (HOG) promotion in New York, where he faced a surprise opponent of Low Ki in a losing effort, after Low Ki answered Galloway's request for a replacement opponent to the absent Chris Dickinson.

Galloway debuted for AAW: Professional Wrestling Redefined (AAW) in a losing effort to Chris Hero on 1 September at "Cero Miedo". At "Unstoppable 2016" on 30 December, after defeating Jeff Cobb, he stated his intention to wrestle for AAW more frequently. On 20 January 2017, Galloway defeated two-time AAW Heavyweight Champion Silas Young in Young's AAW farewell match at "Don't Stop Believing". Galloway debuted for What Culture Pro Wrestling on 24 August 2016, at "WCPW Stacked", defeating Doug Williams. He defeated Joseph Conners and Joe Hendry in a three-way cage match on 30 November to become the new WCPW Champion. Galloway retained the championship against the likes of Hendry, Will Ospreay, Bully Ray and Joe Coffey on the weekly "Loaded" show iPPV events. Following the announcement that Galloway had signed with NXT, a 30-man Rumble was announced for the WCPW World Championship with Galloway defending and entering at #1. Galloway was the 28th man eliminated from the rumble, ultimately losing the match and title to Martin Kirby on 29 April 2017. On 30 April, Galloway made his final appearance in WCPW at the Pro Wrestling World Cup Mexican Qualifying, losing to Cody Rhodes. Galloway returned to the ring following injury at ICW's Fear & Loathing IX event on 20 November as part of Team Black Label in the battle for 100% control of the company. Galloway returned to AAW for their "Homecoming" event on 17 March 2017, defeating Zema Ion before announcing his intention to challenge for the AAW Heavyweight Championship. That same week, Galloway returned to IPW:UK for the first time since 2005, defeating Rampage Brown on 19 March 2017 at "Supershow 7".

Total Nonstop Action Wrestling

The Rising and championship pursuits (2015–2016) 

On 29 January 2015, Galloway made a surprise debut under his real name for Total Nonstop Action Wrestling during the tapings of Impact Wrestling as a face in Glasgow, Scotland, coming to the aid of TNA British Boot Camp season 2 competitor Grado and entering a feud with The Beat Down Clan. The following night, Galloway competed in his first official match for TNA, answering the Beat Down Clan's challenge, he defeated Kenny King. On 27 March episode of Impact Wrestling, he formed the stable "The Rising" with Eli Drake and Micah. On 10 April episode of Impact Wrestling, The Rising defeated The BDC by disqualification when a masked man (Homicide) ran out and attacked Galloway. On 24 April episode of Impact Wrestling, after a match between Micah and Kenny King ended, Galloway and the members of The Rising came to help, only to be beaten down. At Hardcore Justice on 1 May, Galloway defeated Low Ki in a Steel Pipe on a Pole match. At Slammiversary on 28 June, Galloway competed at the King of the Mountain match for the vacant TNA King of the Mountain Championship in a losing effort. On 1 July episode of Impact Wrestling, The Beat Down Clan defeated The Rising in a 4-on-3 Handicap match, forcing The Rising to dissolve.

On 15 July episode of Impact Wrestling, Galloway won a 20-man battle royal to earn the right to face Ethan Carter III for the TNA World Heavyweight Championship later that night, but lost the match after his former The Rising teammate, Eli Drake, attacked him. At No Surrender on 5 August, Galloway lost to Drake. They had a rematch at Turning Point on 19 August, this time with a No Disqualification stipulation, which Galloway won. On 16 September episode of Impact Wrestling, Team TNA (Galloway, Bobby Lashley, Davey Richards, Eddie Edwards and Bram) defeated Team GFW (Jeff Jarrett, Eric Young, Chris Mordetzky, Brian Myers and Sonjay Dutt) in a Lethal Lockdown match to oust GFW from TNA when Galloway pinned Myers after a Future Shock DDT onto a trash can. On 23 September episode of Impact Wrestling, after winning a five-way elimination match against Bram, Bobby Lashley, Davey Richards and Eddie Edwards; Galloway became the number one contender for Ethan Carter III's TNA World Heavyweight Championship. At Bound for Glory on 4 October, Galloway competed in a three-way match for the world title, which was won by Matt Hardy. During October and November, Galloway participated in the TNA World Title Series for the vacant title, which he qualified to the round of 16 by defeating Bram, Rockstar Spud and Grado. However, he failed to advance the round of 8 where was defeated in the main event by Lashley, thus being eliminated from the TNA World Title Series.

Galloway entered a short-lived storyline with Kurt Angle; at TNA One Night Only: Live, Galloway and Angle competed in a 3-Way TNA World Tag Team Championship match, which The Wolves won. On 12 January 2016 episode of Impact Wrestling, Galloway lost to Angle. Galloway earned a future TNA World Heavyweight Championship match by grabbing the briefcase that contained said title shot in the 2016 Feast or Fired match. They faced off in a rematch in Manchester, England on 9 February episode of Impact Wrestling, which Galloway won. After the match, he bowed before Angle, showing respect due to it being part of Angle's farewell tour.

Championship reigns (2016–2017) 
On 15 March episode of Impact Wrestling, Galloway cashed in his Feast or Fired briefcase and defeated Matt Hardy to capture the TNA World Heavyweight Championship for the first time in his career, thus becoming the first-ever Scottish-born TNA World Heavyweight Champion. Galloway announced his plan to be "the first travelling World Champion since Ric Flair" and touted upcoming independent defenses across Europe and the United States. He made his first title defense on 29 March episode of Impact Wrestling, defeating Jeff Hardy to retain the title. On the 5 April episode of Impact Wrestling, Galloway defeated Matt Hardy in a rematch for TNA World Heavyweight Championship. At Sacrifice on 26 April, Galloway overcame rib injuries inflicted from having been repeatedly speared by Lashley to retain his title over the Bound for Gold winner Tyrus. On 17 May episode of Impact Wrestling, Galloway won a lumberjack match against Lashley, who was at the time the #1 contender, by disqualification after he was dragged from the ring and assaulted by the heel lumberjacks, thus retaining his championship. 

Galloway lost the title to Lashley at Slammiversary on 12 June, ending his reign at 89 days. Galloway was twice unsuccessful in regaining his championship from Lashley due to the involvement of Ethan Carter III. Galloway and Carter came to blows in an unsanctioned fight at Destination X on 12 July which ended in a no contest. Galloway was one of the eight men to enter the Bound for Glory Playoff tournament to challenge for the TNA World Heavyweight Championship at Bound for Glory. On 22 July episode of Impact Wrestling, Galloway defeated Bram in the first round of the tournament but was eliminated from the semi-finals by Mike Bennett following interference from Moose and a third inadvertent collision with EC3.

On 25 August episode of Impact Wrestling, Galloway faced Ethan Carter III in a losing effort for a world title shot against Lashley at Bound for Glory. After the match, he attacked the special guest referee Aron Rex, turning heel in the process. Galloway and Rex later feuded with each other, with both men joined the qualifying tournament for the inaugural Impact Grand Championship. After defeating Braxton Sutter in the quarterfinals and Eddie Edwards (via split decision) in the semi-finals, he was scheduled to face Rex in the finals at Bound for Glory to crown the first Grand Champion, but due to an injury he was replaced by Edwards. On 8 December episode of Impact Wrestling, Galloway made his return by interrupting the Impact Grand Champion Moose and criticising the company. On 19 January 2017, Galloway made his in-ring return to TNA, defeating Moose to win the Impact Grand Championship. Galloway retained the title three times, defeating Moose in a rematch at Genesis on 27 January, Mahabali Shera on the 9 February episode of Impact Wrestling, and Rob Ryzin before losing the championship back to Moose via split decision in a second rematch on 2 March episode of Impact Wrestling.

On 26 February 2017, Galloway confirmed that he had parted ways with TNA.

Pro Wrestling Guerrilla (2015–2016) 
Galloway debuted for Pro Wrestling Guerrilla in August 2015, competing in the Battle of Los Angeles tournament. He was eliminated by eventual finalist "Speedball" Mike Bailey on Night 2 before teaming with Chuck Taylor, Aero Star, Drew Gulak and Trent in a winning ten-man tag effort the following night, against Timothy Thatcher, Andrew Everett, Drago, Mark Andrews and Tommaso Ciampa. He returned to PWG on 2 January 2016, for "Lemmy", where he scored his first PWG singles victory over former PWG World Tag Team Champion Jack Evans. Galloway was granted a title shot at "Bowie" on 12 February 2016, challenging former rival Roderick Strong for the PWG World Championship, but lost. Following the match, Galloway was attacked by Strong and Adam Cole until Zack Sabre Jr. made the save. Galloway returned to PWG in March to face Trent and Trevor Lee at "All Star Weekend 12", but lost both contests. He returned to his winning ways at "Prince" on 20 May 2016, issuing an open challenge and defeating Michael Elgin.

Return to WWE

NXT Champion (2017–2018) 
On 1 April 2017, Galloway, once again billed as Drew McIntyre, was shown on-screen sitting in the front row at NXT TakeOver: Orlando. It was later confirmed in an exclusive interview with ESPN that he had re-signed with WWE, and would perform in its developmental territory NXT. On 12 April episode of NXT, McIntyre made his NXT re-debut as a face, with new entrance music and displaying mannerisms he had developed on the independent circuit, defeating Oney Lorcan. On 19 July episode of NXT, McIntyre defeated Killian Dain to become the #1 contender for the NXT Championship, earning the right to challenge Bobby Roode at NXT TakeOver: Brooklyn III. At the event on 19 August, McIntyre defeated Roode to win the NXT Championship. Following the match, McIntyre was attacked by Bobby Fish, Kyle O'Reilly, and the debuting Adam Cole. On the 4 October episode of NXT, McIntyre successfully retained his title against Roderick Strong.

Over the next few weeks, McIntyre began a feud with Andrade "Cien" Almas, that led to general manager William Regal scheduling a championship match at NXT TakeOver: WarGames. The night before that event, McIntyre successfully defended his championship against Adam Cole, with Shawn Michaels as the special guest referee at a house show in San Antonio, Texas. The title defense eventually aired on the WWE Network on 3 January 2018. On 18 November at WarGames, McIntyre lost the NXT Championship to Almas, marking his first loss in NXT. It was then revealed that McIntyre suffered a torn bicep towards the end of the match.

Alliance with Dolph Ziggler (2018–2019) 
On 16 April 2018, during the Superstar Shake-up, McIntyre returned from injury on Raw, attacking Titus Worldwide (Titus O'Neil and Apollo Crews) and aligning himself with Dolph Ziggler, turning heel in the process. McIntyre and Ziggler defeated Titus Worldwide the following week. On 18 June episode of Raw, McIntyre assisted Ziggler in winning the Intercontinental Championship from Seth Rollins. The following week on Raw, Rollins defeated Ziggler by disqualification in a rematch for the championship following interference from McIntyre, allowing Ziggler to retain the title. After the match, Roman Reigns came out to help Rollins fend off McIntyre and Ziggler. With Rollins set to challenge Ziggler for the Intercontinental Championship at Extreme Rules in an Iron man match, McIntyre faced Rollins on the 9 July episode of Raw to determine whether or not he would be allowed at ringside, where McIntyre was victorious. At the event on 15 July, the match went into sudden death overtime, and McIntyre distracted Rollins, allowing Ziggler to retain. On 27 August episode of Raw, McIntyre and Ziggler formed an alliance with Braun Strowman, after he turned on Roman Reigns in a tag team match.

The following week on Raw, McIntyre and Ziggler defeated The B-Team (Bo Dallas and Curtis Axel) to win the Raw Tag Team Championship, beginning their first reign together and McIntyre's second reign individually. McIntyre and Ziggler successfully defended the titles against Seth Rollins and Dean Ambrose at Hell in a Cell on 16 September. At Super Show-Down on 6 October, McIntyre, Ziggler, and Braun Strowman lost to The Shield (Dean Ambrose, Roman Reigns and Seth Rollins). On 22 October episode of Raw, McIntyre and Ziggler lost the Raw Tag Team Championship to Rollins and Ambrose, when Braun Strowman attacked McIntyre.

At Survivor Series on 18 November, McIntyre competed as a member of Team Raw in the Survivor Series match, where he, Bobby Lashley and Braun Strowman were the survivors for Team Raw. On 3 December episode of Raw, McIntyre attacked Ziggler, saying that he was only using him to make a statement, ending their partnership. Ziggler fulfilled his role to bring McIntyre back to the top, causing Ziggler to interrupt and ultimately assault McIntyre, leading to an impromptu match between the two, in which Ziggler defeated McIntyre following Bálor's interference, thus giving McIntyre his first pinfall loss since his return to the main roster. At TLC: Tables, Ladders & Chairs on 16 December, McIntyre lost to Bálor following Ziggler's interference. On 31 December episode of Raw, McIntyre defeated Ziggler in a steel cage match, ending their feud. At Royal Rumble on 27 January 2019, McIntyre entered at #16 and failed to win the Royal Rumble match after being eliminated by Ziggler.

Leading up to Fastlane, McIntyre resumed his feud with The Shield. At Fastlane on 10 March, McIntyre, Baron Corbin and Bobby Lashley lost to The Shield. The next night on Raw, McIntyre viciously assaulted Roman Reigns before his scheduled match up with Baron Corbin; this led to a falls count anywhere match with Dean Ambrose later that night, which McIntyre won. On 18 March episode of Raw, McIntyre challenged Reigns to a match at WrestleMania 35, before defeating Seth Rollins in the main event. The next week on Raw, Reigns accepted McIntyre's challenge before the two began brawling, McIntyre eventually got the upper hand and laid Reigns out with the Claymore Kick. At WrestleMania on 7 April, McIntyre lost to Reigns. On 6 May episode of Raw, McIntyre interrupted Reigns and demanded a WrestleMania rematch, which Reigns accepted and defeated McIntyre by disqualification. After that, McIntyre allied himself with Shane McMahon, becoming his enforcer. At Super ShowDown on 7 June, McMahon defeated Reigns with help from McIntyre. Afterwards, another match between McIntyre and Reigns was scheduled for Stomping Grounds on 23 June, where Reigns defeated McIntyre despite interference from McMahon. McIntyre and McMahon lost to Reigns and The Undertaker in a No Holds Barred tag team match at Extreme Rules on 14 July, ending their feud.

Shortly after Extreme Rules, McIntyre ended his association with McMahon and continued his singles run. In August, McIntyre competed in the King of the Ring tournament, but was eliminated in the first round by Ricochet. After a brief hiatus, McIntyre returned on 21 October episode of Raw, where he was revealed as a member of Ric Flair's team at Crown Jewel. At the event on 31 October, Team Flair lost to Team Hogan. At Survivor Series on 24 November, McIntyre 
was made up part of Team Raw in a losing effort to Team SmackDown in a 5-on-5-on-5 Survivor Series match, also involving Team NXT.

WWE Champion (2020–2021) 
From late 2019 to early 2020, McIntyre embarked on a winning streak, while vowing to win the upcoming Royal Rumble match and receive his first world championship opportunity, while also showing signs of a face turn in the process, becoming more respectful towards his opponents and the fans. At Royal Rumble on 26 January, McIntyre won the Royal Rumble match by lastly eliminating Roman Reigns, earning himself a championship opportunity at WrestleMania 36. In the match, McIntyre eliminated six participants, including WWE Champion Brock Lesnar. The following night on Raw, McIntyre announced that he chose to challenge Lesnar for the WWE Championship at WrestleMania 36, thus turning face in the process. In the main event of the second night of WrestleMania 36 on April 5, McIntyre defeated Lesnar to capture the WWE Championship.

McIntyre made his first successful title defense against Big Show on the same night in WrestleMania 36, which was televised the following night on Raw, before moving onto a feud with Seth Rollins, leading to a championship match between the two at Money in the Bank on 10 May, which McIntyre won. On 18 May episode of Raw, McIntyre started a feud with Bobby Lashley after Lashley and MVP observed McIntyre's match from the stage. At Backlash on 14 June, he retained the title against Lashley. At The Horror Show at Extreme Rules on 19 July, he retained the championship against Dolph Ziggler. McIntyre then transitioned into a feud with Randy Orton for his WWE Championship, culminating in successful championship defenses against Orton at SummerSlam on 23 August in a singles match, and again in an Ambulance match at Clash of Champions on 27 September. On 9 October episode of SmackDown, McIntyre was the number one draft pick and was drafted to remain on the Raw brand. At Hell in a Cell on 25 October, McIntyre lost to Orton in a Hell in a Cell match for the championship, ending McIntyre's first reign at 203 days (202 days as recognised by WWE) and suffering his first loss in 2020.

On 16 November episode of Raw, McIntyre regained the WWE Championship after defeating Randy Orton in a no disqualification match, taking Orton's place to face the Universal Champion Roman Reigns at Survivor Series on 22 November in an interbrand champion vs. champion match, which McIntyre lost via technical submission following interference from Jey Uso. McIntyre successfully defended the title against A.J. Styles and The Miz, who cashed in his Money in the Bank contract at TLC: Tables, Ladders & Chairs on 20 December in a triple threat Tables, ladders, and chairs match. McIntyre and Orton were scheduled to face off again on 11 January 2021, but the match was cancelled after it was announced that McIntyre had tested positive for COVID-19; he recovered soon after. McIntyre retained the title against Keith Lee on an episode of Raw and against Goldberg at the Royal Rumble on 31 January. At Elimination Chamber on 21 February, McIntyre retained the title in a elimination chamber match against Randy Orton, Sheamus, Jeff Hardy, AJ Styles and Kofi Kingston. After the match, he was attacked by Bobby Lashley and The Miz who cashed in his Money In The Bank briefcase (that he got reinstated due to a loophole in the contract), performing the Skull-Crushing Finale to pin McIntyre and win the WWE Championship, ending McIntyre's second reign at 97 days (96 days as recognised by WWE).

On the first night of WrestleMania 37 on April 10, McIntyre challenged Bobby Lashley for the WWE Championship in a losing effort after interference from MVP. At WrestleMania Backlash on 16 May, McIntyre also challenged Lashley in a triple threat match for the title also involving Braun Strowman but was unsuccessful once again. On 31 May episode of Raw, McIntyre started teasing with Kofi Kingston about not beating Brock Lesnar, something that he had done at WrestleMania 36, but after his match he showed respect to Kingston, shaking hands with him after winning the match against him to earn a WWE Championship at Hell in a Cell against Bobby Lashley, with the added stipulation of a Last Chance Hell in a Cell match, which meant that if McIntyre lost, he could no longer challenge for the championship, as long as Lashley remained champion. At the event on 20 June, McIntyre failed once again to defeat Lashley for the title after interference from MVP.

Various feuds (2021–present) 
Shortly after this, McIntyre failed to qualify for Money in the Bank ladder match after losing to Riddle on 21 June episode of Raw, but won a last-chance qualifying match on 28 June, defeating Riddle and AJ Styles to enter the match. At the event on 18 July, McIntyre failed to win the briefcase after being attacked by Jinder Mahal, Veer, and Shanky. It was announced via WWE's social media, that McIntyre would face Mahal at SummerSlam. On 16 August episode of Raw, McIntyre defeated Veer and Shanky in order to ban them from ringside at SummerSlam. At the event on 21 August, McIntyre defeated Mahal. On 30 August episode of Raw, McIntyre failed to win the United States Championship in a triple threat match also involving Sheamus after the champion Damian Priest pinned McIntyre. On 27 September episode of Raw, he returned after a couple of weeks of absence, confronting WWE Champion Big E after his successful title defense against Lashley.

As part of the 2021 Draft, McIntyre was drafted to the SmackDown brand. At Crown Jewel on 21 October, McIntyre faced Big E for the WWE Championship, but lost. At Survivor Series on 21 November, McIntyre was the captain of Team SmackDown, but he was eliminated via count out and his team lost the match to Team Raw, with Seth Rollins being the sole survivor. On 3 December episode of SmackDown, McIntyre started a feud with Happy Corbin and Madcap Moss after they made fun of how McIntyre was not in a battle royal with the winner becoming the number one contender for the Universal Championship. On 17 December episode of SmackDown, it was announced that he would face Moss at Day 1. At Day 1 on 1 January 2022, McIntyre defeated Moss. McIntyre participated in the Royal Rumble match at the namesake event on 29 January, but was the last competitor eliminated by eventual winner Brock Lesnar. At Elimination Chamber on 19 February, McIntyre defeated Moss again in a Falls Count Anywhere match; during the match, he performed an inverted Alabama Slam, which resulted in Moss landing directly on top of his head, but he was able to continue the match. On the first night of WrestleMania 38 on 2 April, McIntyre defeated Corbin and became the first person to kick out of his finisher, the End of Days. At WrestleMania Backlash on 8 May, McIntyre and RK-Bro lost to Roman Reigns and The Usos. At Money in the Bank on 2 July, McIntyre competed in the Money in the Bank ladder match, which was won by Theory.

On 8 July episode of SmackDown, McIntyre was scheduled to face Sheamus to determine the #1 contender for the Undisputed WWE Universal Championship at Clash at the Castle, but as Sheamus feigned illness, the match did not occur. The match was later rescheduled for 29 July episode as a "Good Old Fashioned Donnybrook" match, which McIntyre won. At SummerSlam the following night, Roman Reigns retained the title against Brock Lesnar, confirming that Reigns would be the defending champion against McIntyre at Clash at the Castle. In the weeks leading up to the event, McIntyre was attacked by the returning Karrion Kross and his wife Scarlett. At Clash at the Castle on 3 September, McIntyre failed to win the titles from Reigns after interference from the debuting Solo Sikoa. On 23 September episode of SmackDown, McIntyre challenged Kross to a strap match at Extreme Rules, which he accepted. At the event on 8 October, McIntyre lost to Kross after interference from Scarlett. At Crown Jewel on 5 November, McIntyre defeated Kross in a steel cage match by escaping the cage to end their feud despite another interference from Scarlett. Three weeks later at Survivor Series WarGames on 26 November, McIntyre teamed up with The Brawling Brutes (Sheamus, Ridge Holland and Butch) and Kevin Owens in a WarGames match against The Bloodline in a losing effort. At the Royal Rumble on 28 January 2023, McIntyre entered the Royal Rumble match at #9 but was eliminated by Gunther.

Other media

Video games 
McIntyre is a playable character in the video games WWE SmackDown vs. Raw 2011, WWE 12, WWE 13 (DLC), WWE 2K14, WWE 2K18 (DLC), WWE 2K19, WWE 2K20, WWE 2K Battlegrounds  WWE 2K22 and WWE 2K23.

Books 
McIntyre's autobiography, A Chosen Destiny: My Story, was released on 22 April 2021.

Personal life 
Galloway became engaged to American professional wrestler Taryn Terrell (also known as Tiffany) in July 2009, and they were married in Las Vegas in May 2010. They were divorced in May 2011.
Galloway married Kaitlyn Frohnapfel on 10 December 2016. The couple currently resides in Nashville, Tennessee, having previously lived Tampa, Florida.

Galloway's mother, Angela, died on 3 November 2012 at the age of 51.

Galloway is a supporter of Scottish football club Rangers. He is good friends with Irish professional wrestler Sheamus in real life, having come up together in the British and Irish independent circuit.

Championships and accomplishments 

 British Championship Wrestling
 BCW Heavyweight Championship (2 times)
 CBS Sports
 Wrestler of the Year (2020)
 Danish Pro Wrestling
 DPW Heavyweight Championship (1 time)
 Evolve
 Evolve Championship (1 time)
 Evolve Tag Team Championship (2 times, inaugural) – with Johnny Gargano (1) and Dustin (1)
 Evolve Tag Team Championship Tournament (2016) – with Johnny Gargano
 Open the Freedom Gate Championship (1 time)
 Florida Championship Wrestling
 FCW Florida Heavyweight Championship (1 time)
 FCW Florida Tag Team Championship (2 times) – with Stu Sanders
 Insane Championship Wrestling
 ICW World Heavyweight Championship (2 times)
 ICW Hall of Fame (2018)
 ICW Award (4 times)
 Moment of the Year (2014) – Surprise return at "Shug's Hoose Party"
 Promo of the Year (2014) – "Shug's Hoose Party"
 Feud of the Year (2016) – The Black Label Vs. Insane Championship Wrestling
 Best on the Mic (2016)
 Inside The Ropes Magazine
 Ranked No. 1 of the top 50 wrestlers in the world in the ITR 50 in 2020.
 Irish Whip Wrestling
 IWW International Heavyweight Championship (1 time)
 Outback Championship Wrestling
 OCW World Heavyweight Championship (1 time)
 Preston City Wrestling
 There Can Be Only One Gauntlet (2016)
 Pro Wrestling Illustrated
 Most Improved Wrestler of the Year (2020)
 Ranked No. 4 of the top 500 singles wrestlers in the PWI 500 in 2020 and 2021
 Scottish Wrestling Alliance
 Scottish Heavyweight Championship (1 time)
 Scottish Wrestling Network
 OSWtv/SWN Award (2 times)
 Match of the Year (2015) -  
 Outstanding Recognition Award for Extraordinary Service (2018)
 Hall of Fame (2018)
 Sports Illustrated
 Ranked No. 3 of the top 10 wrestlers in 2020
 Total Nonstop Action Wrestling
 Impact Grand Championship (1 time)
 TNA World Heavyweight Championship (1 time)
 Feast or Fired (2016 – World Heavyweight Championship contract)
 Global Impact Tournament (2015) – with Team International 
 TNA Joker's Wild (2016)
 Union of European Wrestling Alliances
 European Heavyweight Championship (1 time)
 What Culture Pro Wrestling
 WCPW World Championship (1 time)
 Defiant Wrestling Award for Match of the Year (2017) – Vs. Will Ospreay at "Exit Wounds"
 WWE
 WWE Championship (2 times) 
 WWE Intercontinental Championship (1 time)
 NXT Championship (1 time)
 WWE (Raw) Tag Team Championship (2 times) – with Cody Rhodes (1) and Dolph Ziggler (1)
 Thirty-first Triple Crown Champion
 Men's Royal Rumble (2020)
 Raw's Gold Medal of Excellence (2018)
 Bumpy Award (2 times)
 Superstar of the Half-Year (2020)
 Lifetime Achievement Award (2021)
 Slammy Award (2 times)
 Superstar of the Year (2020)
 Male Superstar of the Year (2020)
 Wrestlers Reunion Scotland
 The George Kidd Scottish Wrestling Hall of Fame (2017)

References

External links 

 
 
 
 
 
 

1985 births
21st-century professional wrestlers
Alumni of Glasgow Caledonian University
Expatriate professional wrestlers
Living people
NXT Champions
People educated at Prestwick Academy
People from Prestwick
Scottish expatriates in the United States
Scottish male professional wrestlers
Sportspeople from Ayr
TNA World Heavyweight/Impact World Champions
WWF/WWE Intercontinental Champions
WWE Champions
Impact Grand Champions
FCW Florida Heavyweight Champions
FCW Florida Tag Team Champions